The following is a list of notable events and releases of the year 1901 in Norwegian music.

Events

Deaths

Births

 January
 4 – Kari Marie Aarvold Glaser, pianist and music teacher (died 1972).

 August
 16 – Olav Kielland, composer and conductor (died 1985).

 July
 7 – Erling Kjellsby, organist and composer (died 1976).

 October
 6 – Aslak Brekke, traditional folk singer (died 1978).
 8 – Eivind Groven, microtonal composer and music-theorist (died 1977).

See also
 1901 in Norway
 Music of Norway

References

 
Norwegian music
Norwegian
Music
1900s in Norwegian music